Telmatherina opudi is a species of fish in the subfamily Telmatherininae part of the family Melanotaeniidae, the rainbowfishes. It is endemic to Indonesia. his species was described in 1991 by Maurice Kottelat from a type locality of Lake Matano. Kottelat gave the species the specific name of opudi which is the local name for all the species of Telmatherina found in Lake Matano.

Sources

opudi
Taxa named by Maurice Kottelat
Taxonomy articles created by Polbot
Fish described in 1991